1-Aminomethyl-5-methoxyindane (AMMI), is a drug developed by a team led by David E. Nichols at Purdue University, which acts as a selective serotonin releasing agent (SSRA) and binds to the serotonin transporter with similar affinity to DFMDA.

See also 
 2CB-Ind

References 

Indanes
Phenol ethers
Serotonin releasing agents
Entactogens and empathogens
Phenethylamines
Methoxy compounds